Trond Iversen (born 22 March 1976) is a Norwegian cross-country skier who competed between 1996 and 2010.

Iversen has a total of ten victories since 2001. His best finish at the Winter Olympics was sixth in the individual sprint at the 2002 Games in Salt Lake City. His best finish at the FIS Nordic World Ski Championships was ninth in the individual sprint event at the 2005 championships in Oberstdorf, Germany.

Despite being ranked third in the 2006–07 World Cup Sprint category standings as of 16 February 2007, Iversen was not selected to represent the Norwegian team at the FIS Nordic World Ski Championships 2007 in Sapporo, Japan.

Iversen is married and has two children.

Cross-country skiing results
All results are sourced from the International Ski Federation (FIS).

Olympic Games

World Championships

World Cup

Season titles
 1 title – (1 sprint)

Season standings

Individual podiums
 2 victories – (2 ) 
 7 podiums – (7 )

Team podiums
 1 victory – (1 )
 2 podiums – (2 )

References

External links
Eurosport.com profile

1976 births
Living people
Cross-country skiers at the 2002 Winter Olympics
Cross-country skiers at the 2006 Winter Olympics
Norwegian male cross-country skiers
Olympic cross-country skiers of Norway
Sportspeople from Drammen